Princess Mele Siuilikutapu of Tonga (born 12 May 1948) is a Tongan royal and former politician. In 1975 she was elected to the Legislative Assembly, becoming its first female member.

Biography
Siu’ilikutapu was born in May 1948, the oldest daughter of Prince Fatafehi Tuʻipelehake and his wife Melenaite Tupoumoheofo Veikune. She attended the University of Auckland, where in October 1969 she married Josh Liava'a, a policeman. As a result, King Tāufaʻāhau Tupou IV had her returned to Tonga and annulled the marriage. The following year she married Kalanivalu-Fotofili, a noble.

In 1975 she contested the elections to the Legislative Assembly, and was elected as a people's representative in Tongatapu, becoming the country's first female parliamentarian. She remained a member until 1978.

She later became deputy president of the National Women's Organisation.

Honours
National honours
  Order of the Crown of Tonga, Grand Cross (31 July 2008).

References

1948 births
Living people
Tongan royalty
University of Auckland alumni
Tongan women in politics
Members of the Legislative Assembly of Tonga